Mandawar is a town in the Dausa district in the Indian state of Rajasthan.

History
The town of Mandawar is situated in the north-eastern region of Rajasthan, a region widely known as Mewat.

Geography
Mandawar is situated in the northern part of Dausa district of Rajasthan at an elevation of 253 m.

Demographics
Mandawar is a town with population of under 11,960 in 2011 census.

Mandawar Pin code is 321609 and postal head office is Mahwa Road.

Banawar (6 km), Raipur (2 KM), Reendli (3 KM), Garh Himmat Singh (3 KM), Ukroond (4 KM), Jatwara (4 KM) are the nearby Villages to Mandawar. Mandawar is surrounded by Reni Tehsil towards west, Kathumar Tehsil towards North, Weir Tehsil towards East, Bandikui Tehsil towards west.

Mahwa, Rajgarh (Alwar), Todabhim, Bandikui are the near by Cities to Mandawar..

Mandawar Pin Code is 321609.

Language
Hindi and Rajasthani languages are spoken in MandawarAhirwati, also called ‘Hirwati’ (the language of Ahirs also Language of Rajputana), is spoken in Ahirwal region.

Rewari, Mahendergarh, Narnaul, Gurgaon, Kotkasim, Kotputli, Bansur, Behror and Mundawar may be considered as the centre of Ahirwati speaking area.

Location

Mandawar town is located in the National Capital Region, 125 km south of Delhi, 140 km north of state capital Jaipur, 39.5 km north of Alwar city, 28 km east of Behror 25 km east of Rewari city, 70 km south of Dharuhera, 65 km south of Bhiwadi and 20 km north of Tijara, another town in Dausa district.

It is easily reached from NH8 (Delhi-Jaipur-Mumbai highway) via Behror. Regular buses connect Mandawar to Behror, Khairthal, Rewari, Dharuhera.

References

Cities and towns in Dausa district